Earl Jones was an American Negro league third baseman in the 1930s.

Jones played for the Detroit Stars in 1937. In three recorded games, he posted two hits in ten plate appearances.

References

External links
Baseball statistics and player information from Baseball-Reference Black Baseball Stats and Seamheads

Year of birth missing
Year of death missing
Place of birth missing
Place of death missing
Detroit Stars (1937) players